Steven Patrick Marie Josee Wong (born on 28 April 1988) is a BMX cyclist for Hong Kong.

Steven Wong was born to a Hong Kong Chinese father and Belgian mother. he has a little sister and grew up in Belgium.  His father has a restaurant in Belgium. He was invited to race for Belgium but decided to race for Hong Kong instead.

He first raced for Hong Kong at the 2005 China National Games and won the Gold Medal in BMX cycling.

In 2009, he fell at the 2009 China National Games and failed to defend his gold medal.

Then in December 2009 he won the Gold Medal at the East Asian Games. In November 2010 he won the Gold Medal at the Asian Games in Guangzhou.

Doping 
Wong tested positive for Exogenous Steroids in an out-of-competition test 10 April 2012, and was handed a two-year suspension for doping.

References

External links
Official website
Interview at the Hong Kong Olympic Council.

Living people
1988 births
Hong Kong male cyclists
Doping cases in cycling
Chinese sportspeople in doping cases
Hong Kong people of Belgian descent
Cyclists at the 2010 Asian Games
Asian Games medalists in cycling
Asian Games gold medalists for Hong Kong
Medalists at the 2010 Asian Games
Belgian male cyclists
Belgian people of Hong Kong descent
Sportspeople from Turnhout
Cyclists from Antwerp Province